Rectal tenesmus is a feeling of incomplete defecation.  It is the sensation of inability or difficulty to empty the bowel at defecation, even if the bowel contents have already been evacuated. Tenesmus indicates the feeling of a residue, and is not always correlated with the actual presence of residual fecal matter in the rectum. It is frequently painful and may be accompanied by involuntary straining and other gastrointestinal symptoms. Tenesmus has both a nociceptive and a neuropathic component.

Often, rectal tenesmus is simply called tenesmus. The term rectal tenesmus is a retronym to distinguish defecation-related tenesmus from vesical tenesmus. Vesical tenesmus is a similar condition, experienced as a feeling of incomplete voiding despite the bladder being empty.

Tenesmus is a closely related topic to obstructed defecation.

Considerations
Tenesmus is characterized by a sensation of needing to pass stool, accompanied by pain, cramping, and straining. Despite straining, little stool is passed.  Tenesmus is generally associated with inflammatory diseases of the bowel, which may be caused by either infectious or noninfectious conditions. Conditions associated with tenesmus include:

 Amebiasis
 Chronic arsenic poisoning
 Coeliac disease
 Colorectal cancer
 Anal melanoma 
 Cystocele
 Cytomegalovirus (in immunocompromised patients)
 Diverticular disease
 Dysentery
 Hemorrhoid, which are prolapsed
 Imperforate hymen
 Inflammatory bowel disease
 Irritable bowel syndrome
 Ischemic colitis
 Kidney stones, when a stone is lodged in the lower ureter
 Pelvic organ prolapse
 Radiation proctitis
 Rectal gonorrhea
 Rectal lymphogranuloma venereum
 Rectal parasitic infection, particularly Trichuris trichiura (whipworm)
 Rectocele
 Shigellosis
 Ulcerative colitis

Tenesmus (rectal) is also associated with the installation of either a reversible or non reversible stoma where rectal disease may or may not be present. Patients who experience tenesmus as a result of stoma installation can experience the symptoms of tenesmus for the duration of the stoma presence. Long term pain management may need to be considered as a result.

Treatment
Pain relief is administered concomitantly to the treatment of the primary disease causing tenesmus.

See also
 Constipation
 Encopresis
 Fecal incontinence

References

External links 

 

Symptoms and signs: Digestive system and abdomen
Defecation